Bohdan Chlíbec (born 1963, in Teplice, Czechoslovakia) is a Czech poet. He lives in Prague since 1971. H works as a librarian at Clementinum. Collection of his poems under the title Zimní dvůr was awarded by the readers award at Lidové noviny in 2013.

His works 
Zasněžený popel (Snow-covered ash), 1992
Temná komora (Darkroom), 1998
Zimní dvůr (Winter yard), 2013
Krev burzy (Stock blood), 2019

References 

People from Teplice
1963 births
Czech poets
Czech male poets
Living people